The Ridin' Fool is a 1931 American Western film directed by John P. McCarthy and written by Wellyn Totman. Produced by Trem Carr, the film was released on 25 May 1931 by Tiffany Productions, Inc.

Premise 
Although innocent, gambler Boston Harry is scheduled to be hanged by vigilantes for the murder of Jim Beckworth. Boston's friend, cowboy Steve Kendall, rescues him, even though they are both in love with Juanita, a half-Mexican woman, who transfers her allegiance to whoever has the most money, leading to a dispute between the two.

Cast 
Bob Steele as Steve Kendall
Frances Morris as Sally Warren
Florence Turner as Ma Warren
Ted Adams as Boston Harry
Alan Bridge as Nikkos
Eddie Fetherston as Bud Warren
Jack Henderson as Col. Butterfield
Gordon De Main as Sheriff Anderson
Josephine Velez as Juanita
Fern Emmett as Miss Scully

References

External links 
 
 

Films directed by John P. McCarthy
American Western (genre) films
1931 Western (genre) films
1931 films
American black-and-white films
1930s American films